87 Crown Street is a heritage-listed shop at 87 Crown Street, Wollongong, City of Wollongong, New South Wales, Australia. It was added to the New South Wales State Heritage Register on 2 April 1999.

History 

It was built  1870s-1880s and has been in continuous use as retail premises since that time. It was used as W. McInnes' tailor shop  1900 and housed Coad's secondhand jewellery store from  1940-1960.

In 2018, it houses cafe Lee and Me.

It is close by a number of other historic or landmark buildings, including the Wollongong Town Hall and the Old Wollongong East Post Office.

Description

It is a terrace shop with a decorative facade and verandah. It has been described as "one of Wollongong's last remaining commercial structures of the nineteenth century".

Heritage listing 
87 Crown St was listed on the New South Wales State Heritage Register on 2 April 1999.

See also

References

Attribution

External links

New South Wales State Heritage Register
Wollongong
Retail buildings in New South Wales
Articles incorporating text from the New South Wales State Heritage Register